The Jenckes House is a historic house at 1730 Old Louisquisset Pike in Lincoln, Rhode Island, United States.  It is a -story timber-frame structure, five bays wide, with a large central chimney.  The main entrance is flanked by pilasters and topped by a transom window and heavy molded cap.  Additions extend the house to the south and northwest.  The main block is estimated to have been built around 1760, by a member of the locally prominent Jenckes family.

The house was listed on the National Register of Historic Places in 1984.

See also
Jenckes House (Jenckes Hill Road, Lincoln, Rhode Island)
National Register of Historic Places listings in Providence County, Rhode Island

References

Houses on the National Register of Historic Places in Rhode Island
Houses completed in 1760
Houses in Lincoln, Rhode Island
National Register of Historic Places in Providence County, Rhode Island